Hoje É Dia de Maria (English: Today Is Maria's Day) was a Brazilian miniseries directed and written by Luiz Fernando Carvalho, co-written by Luis Alberto de Abreu and Carlos Alberto Soffredini, basing themselves on a selection of stories taken from popular Brazilian oral storytelling tradition, collected by the writers Câmara Cascudo, Mário de Andrade and Sílvio Romero. It was produced in 8 episodes and exhibited in 2005 by Rede Globo.

Compared with To the Left of the Father on account of its innovative television language, it caught the attention of critics and public by its novel, theatrical and playful language in transporting the universe of popular culture to a sophisticated television production, without losing its authenticity. The critic Nilson Xavier considers it one of the most poetic, original and beautiful productions of recent years. According to Jean-Philippe Tessé, in the French magazine Cahiers du Cinéma, the mini-series was very ambitious and formally very well produced, following other noteworthy projects such as The Maias (Os Maias).

Production 
Art direction by Lia Renha, guest artist Raimundo Rodriguez, direction of photography by José Tadeu Ribeiro and costumes by Luciana Buarque. The 60 marionettes that represented the animals were produced by the Grupo Giramundo, from Minas Gerais state. The work marked the start of the partnership between the director and psychoanalyst Carlos Byington, as advisor on the mythological dramatization of the text. The mini-series was conceived under a 360º dome, scrap from a rock show stage. The sound track, by Tim Rescala, was based on cirandas (traditional dances) by Heitor Villa-Lobos, César Guerra-Peixe and Francisco Mignone. Designer Jum Nakao was responsible for some of the costumes, with animation of the stop-motion scenes by Cesar Coelho, founder of the Anima Mundi festival.

Plot 
This is a story filled with other stories. Hidden in our childhood memories, these stories still stay with us secretly, awaiting only the right moment to reappear. That's the substance of Maria's journey through the world, like a small Ulysses trying to get home to her parents.

Cast 

Artistas especialmente convidados

Spin-off 
A second season with 5 episodes titled Hoje É Dia de Maria: Segunda Jornada, was shown in the same year.  A musical version of the novel debuted in São Paulo in September 2016, but it is not approaching the television version that was exhibited in 2005.

Awards and nominations

References

External links 
 Hoje é Dia de Maria - Official website 
 
 Hoje é Dia de Maria on Memória Globo 
 Hoje é Dia de Maria - Second Journey on Memória Globo 
 Today is Maria´s Day on Cinemotions 

2005 Brazilian television series debuts
2005 Brazilian television series endings
Brazilian television miniseries
Television series created by Luiz Fernando Carvalho